Flow Energy was an energy supplier in the United Kingdom owned by Co-op Energy.  Its headquarters were in Ipswich, Suffolk. The company was launched as a small independent domestic energy supply company in April 2013, supplying gas and electricity to homes throughout the UK. Flow Energy was acquired by Co-op Energy in May 2018, and the Flow brand continued to be used until August 2019 when the customers were acquired by Octopus Energy.

Flow Energy also developed a household electricity-generating gas boiler, the Flow boiler, which provided heating and hot water and also generated electricity, using patented technology.

History
Until 2018 Flow Energy was part of Flowgroup plc, an energy innovation and services company listed on the AIM exchange of the London Stock Market and founded in 1998.

In April 2014, Flow Energy launched its domestic energy supply service. At the end of 2015 Flow Energy exceeded 100,000 home energy customer accounts. 

In December 2015, the company announced a deal with Shell Energy Europe to provide access to wholesale energy – gas and electricity – without the need for significant levels of collateral to be deposited. The deal was designed to enable growth in the company's energy supply business and increase the customer base for its product and services.

In April 2018, Flowgroup plc announced its intention to sell Flow Energy to Co-op Energy. Flowgroup had previously sold its boiler technology business to focus on energy supply. The sale was completed in May 2018 and following the completion of the sale of the boiler and the Energy business, Flowgroup de-listed from the UK stock market and subsequently entered administration in November 2018.

On 2 October 2020, Ofgem published its notice of proposal to issue a Final Order (FO) on Flow Energy in accordance with Section 25(1) of the Electricity Act 1989 (EA89).

Boiler
Around 2014, the company developed a household boiler that fed back electricity to the local distribution network. The boiler, which was available to customers from early 2016 but never appeared on general sale, provided heating and hot water whilst also generating low-carbon electricity using its patented MicroCHP (Combined Heat and Power) technology, in which waste heat evaporated a low-boiling-point liquid to run an interlocking twin 2D scroll-shape turbine generator. The boiler was not economically viable. Questions regarding the reliability of the boiler were raised, but never answered following little evidence of any significant installations having taken place. Projected  figures for installations proved overly optimistic.

The boiler was manufactured by Jabil Circuit Inc, an OEM manufacturing partner. The boiler was designed in Capenhurst near Chester and manufactured in Livingston, Scotland. In July 2014 the company opened a research, training and development facility in Runcorn, Cheshire, where Gas Safe registered engineers undertook surveying, installation and aftercare training programmes to become accredited installers of the Flow boiler.

However, by 2017 the boiler became uneconomic in the British market after reductions in government subsidy via the feed-in-tariff scheme. The company had previously used VAT as a reason for the boiler being not economically viable. In April 2018, Flow sold the assets related to the microCHP business to iGEN Technologies Inc. of Canada.

Smart products
In March 2016 the company launched a range of connected home devices including a smart thermostat, smart plugs and an energy consumption monitor. The devices were controlled and monitored through a smart phone app or an online panel and offered customers extra control over appliances and energy usage, as well as savings on energy.

Awards
In March 2015 Flow Energy was awarded a Real Business Everline Future 50 award, in the Environment and Sustainability category, for being one of the most disruptive British businesses of 2015.

In 2016, Flow Energy was one of only two energy suppliers to be awarded Which? Provider of the year 2016. Flow Energy was awarded Which? Recommended Provider status following comprehensive analysis of Flow Energy's policies, pricing, communications, customer service and complaint handling. The assessment process also included a survey of Flow Energy's customers which generated a Which? customer score of 73%; the overall industry average is 53%.

References

External links 
 

Electric power companies of the United Kingdom
Natural gas companies of the United Kingdom
Utilities of the United Kingdom
Companies based in Suffolk
Defunct oil and gas companies of the United Kingdom